Lawrence H. Ford is an American physicist.

Ford earned a bachelor's of science degree in physics at Michigan State University in 1970 and pursued graduate study in the subject at Princeton University, completing a master's of arts in 1970, followed by a doctorate in 1974. He began his teaching career at Tufts University in September 1980 as an assistant professor. Ford was promoted to an associate professorship in 1985 and elevated to full professor in 1992. In 2004, Ford was elected a fellow of the American Physical Society, "[f]or pioneering contributions to quantum field theory in flat and curved spacetime."

References

Fellows of the American Physical Society
Quantum physicists
Year of birth missing (living people)
Living people
Tufts University faculty
Michigan State University alumni
Princeton University alumni
21st-century American physicists
20th-century American physicists